Duckworth is a surname, and may refer to:

Actual persons 
 Angela Duckworth (born 1970), American psychologist, MacArthur fellow
 Anthony Duckworth-Chad (born 1942), English businessman and senior county officer
 Arthur Duckworth (1901–1986), British politician
 Ben Duckworth (born 1974), Australian rugby league footballer
 Billy Duckworth (born 1959), Australian rules footballer
 Bob Duckworth, American politician
 Bobby Duckworth (born 1958), American football player
 Brandon Duckworth (born 1976), American baseball player
 Carl W. Duckworth (1955–2018), American politician
 Christopher Duckworth (1933–2014), South African cricketer
 Dick Duckworth (footballer born 1880), English footballer
 Dick Duckworth (footballer, born 1906), English footballer
 Don Duckworth, former NASCAR Cup Series driver
 Sir Dyce Duckworth, English physician and 1st Baronet Duckworth, of Grosvenor Place
 Eleanor Duckworth (born 1935), Canadian thinker and educator
 Frank Duckworth, a cricket statistician who co-invented the Duckworth–Lewis method for determining the result of shortened one-day cricket matches
 George Duckworth (1901–1966), English cricketer
 George Herbert Duckworth (1868–1934), English public servant
 Gerald Duckworth (1870–1937), English publisher
 Henry Duckworth (1915–2008), Canadian physicist and university administrator
 James Duckworth (born 1992), Australian professional tennis player
 John Duckworth (physicist) (1916–2015), British physicist
 Admiral Sir John Thomas Duckworth, British naval officer
 Col. Joseph Duckworth (1903–1964), American aviator
 Justin Duckworth, Anglican bishop of Wellington, New Zealand
 Keith Duckworth (1933–2005), English engineer
 Kendrick Lamar Duckworth (born 1987), American rapper and songwriter
 Kevin Duckworth (1964–2008), U.S. basketball player
 Michael Duckworth (born 1992), English footballer
 Muriel Duckworth (1908–2009), Canadian feminist
 Canon Noel Duckworth (1912–1980), Canon of Accra
 Reverend Robinson Duckworth, contemporary of Lewis Carroll and model for the duck in Alice's Adventures in Wonderland
 Susan Duckworth, American politician
 Tammy Duckworth (born 1968), American politician serving as the junior Senator from the state of Illinois
 Thomas Duckworth (disambiguation), multiple people
 William Duckworth (disambiguation), multiple people
 Willie Duckworth,  U.S. soldier and composer of The Duckworth Chant (or Sound Off!),

Fictional persons 
 Dom Duckworth, fictional character in the children’s TV show Horrible Histories
 Jack Duckworth, fictional character in the soap opera Coronation Street
 Vera Duckworth, fictional character in the soap opera Coronation Street; wife of Jack
 Clifford Duckworth, fictional character from the soap opera Coronation Street; brother of Jack
 Elsie Duckworth, fictional character from the soap opera Coronation Street; wife of Clifford
 Terry Duckworth, fictional character in the soap opera Coronation Street; son of Jack and Vera
 Lisa Duckworth, fictional character in the soap opera Coronation Street; wife of Terry
 Tommy Duckworth, fictional character in the soap opera Coronation Street; son of Terry and Lisa
 Frank Duckworth, fictional character in the TV show Black-ish
 Donna Duckworth, fictional character in the TV show Black-ish; wife of Frank
 Sharon Duckworth, fictional character in the TV show Black-ish; daughter of Frank and Donna
 Carl Duckworth, fictional character in the Kendrick Lamar (see above) song FEAR.; cousin of Lamar

See also 
 Duckworth

References 

English-language surnames